James Lorne Smith (born September 8, 1954) is a former Major League Baseball player who played for the Pittsburgh Pirates  in . He was used as both a shortstop and a pinch runner.

External links
, or Baseball Reference (Minors)

1954 births
Living people
Baseball players from California
Bluefield Orioles players
Charlotte O's players
Denver Bears players
Long Beach State Dirtbags baseball players
Major League Baseball shortstops
Pittsburgh Pirates players
Portland Beavers players
Rochester Red Wings players
Tiburones de La Guaira players
American expatriate baseball players in Venezuela
Tidewater Tides players